Juan Maeso Velez (born in 1942) is a Spanish anaesthetist infected with hepatitis C who was sentenced to 1,933 years in prison for infecting hundreds of patients with the virus as he used the same needles to give both himself and the patients opioids.

He infected 275 people between 1988 and 1997. He was sentenced to 1,933 years in prison, but the most he can serve under Spanish law is 20 years. He was ordered to pay 500,000 euros (US$680,000) to each victim or their survivors.

References

1942 births
Living people
20th-century Spanish physicians
20th-century Spanish criminals